Pouillon may refer to the following places in France:

 Pouillon, Landes, a commune in the Landes department
 Pouillon, Marne, a commune in the Marne department

It may also be a French surname, which may refer to:

 Fernand Pouillon modernist architect
 Jean Pouillon anthropologist and africanist